Triumph of 1562 was the first vessel of record to hold the name. She was a 60-gun English galleon built in Deptford in 1561–62 and launched in October 1562.

With a nominal burden of 1000 tons, she was the largest ship built in England during the reign of Queen Elizabeth I. Triumph was a square-rigged galleon of four masts, including two lateen-rigged mizzenmasts. She served effectively as the flagship of Vice-Admiral Martin Frobisher during the battle of the Spanish Armada in 1588. In 1595–96 she was rebuilt as a race-built galleon, but at the time of the Commission of Enquiry in 1618 she was condemned and broken up.

Notes

References 

 R C Anderson. List of English Men of War 1509 - 1649.
 Rif Winfield, British Warships in the Age of Sail 1603-1714: Design, Construction, Careers and Fates. Seaforth Publishing, 2009. .

External links 
 Warship design site

Ships of the English navy
16th-century ships
Ships built in Deptford